Mino Guerrini (16 December 1927 – 10 January 1990) was an Italian director, screenwriter, journalist, actor and painter.

Biography

Born in Rome as Giacomo Guerrini, Guerrini entered the cinema industry in 1954 as screenwriter in Marcello Pagliero's Vergine moderna;  after several collaborations (including the screenplay of Mario Bava's The Girl Who Knew Too Much) he made his directorial debut in an episode of the film Amore in quattro dimensioni and from then started a prolific career, mainly focused on comedy films. He was also a character actor, often in his own films; as actor he's probably best known for the role of Nino in Damiano Damiani's La rimpatriata.

Filmography
as director
1964: Amore in 4 dimensioni
1964: Love and Marriage
1965: Up and Down
1966: The Third Eye
1966: Killer 77, Alive or Dead
1966: Omicidio per appuntamento
1968: Days of Fire
1972: Gli altri racconti di Canterbury
1973: Un ufficiale non si arrende mai nemmeno di fronte all'evidenza, firmato Colonnello Buttiglione
1974: Il colonnello Buttiglione diventa generale
1976: Ragazza alla pari
1977: Von Buttiglione Sturmtruppenführe
1982: Cuando calienta el sol... vamos a la playa
1986: Le miniere del Kilimangiaro

References

External links 
 

1927 births
1990 deaths
Male actors from Rome
Italian film directors
20th-century Italian screenwriters
Italian male screenwriters
Italian male film actors
20th-century Italian male actors
Italian contemporary artists
20th-century Italian male writers